To All the Boys: Always and Forever is a 2021 American teen romantic comedy film directed by Michael Fimognari and starring Lana Condor and Noah Centineo. The film is based on Jenny Han's 2017 novel Always and Forever, Lara Jean and is a sequel to To All the Boys: P.S. I Still Love You (2020), and the third and final installment in the To All the Boys film series.  It was released on February 12, 2021, by Netflix.

Plot
Lara Jean Covey, accompanied by her sisters, Kitty and Margot; her father, Dan; and her neighbor Trina Rothschild, visits Seoul for spring break. She reconnects with the memory of her mother by searching for a lock her mother had left on a bridge to memorialize her love for Dan, and finally manages to read her accompanying message, which says "for the rest of my life." Returning home, she mentions to her boyfriend, Peter Kavinsky, that the two of them never had a meet-cute, meeting Peter's disbelief because he remembers their first meeting quite well. She nervously waits for the result of her Stanford University application so she can attend college with Peter. As Dan's relationship with Trina becomes more serious and the family begins to plan their upcoming wedding, Lara Jean is accepted to her safety schools, the University of California, Berkeley and New York University, but disappointed when she is rejected from Stanford.

Initially leaning towards Berkeley to live closer to Peter, Lara Jean enjoys New York City during a school trip and decides on NYU. She explains her decision to Peter, but his disappointment at her decision is palpable, and he decides to break up with her on prom night to save himself what he sees as the inevitable breakdown of a long-distance relationship. Respecting Lara Jean's wishes, Peter skips Dan and Trina's wedding; he also meets with his formerly absentee father for a meal and chooses to try and reconnect despite the years of his absence. After the wedding festivities, Kitty conspires with Peter to set up a meeting between him and Lara Jean under the wedding tent. Peter walks in and asks her to sign on, to which she joyfully assents. The film ends with Lara Jean's reflection on wanting what she has with Peter, regardless of what films say and what stereotypes say about long-distance relationships. She remains optimistic that the distance will offer them the opportunity to keep writing love letters to one another.

Cast

 Lana Condor as Lara Jean, a high school student and Peter's girlfriend
 Momona Tamada as young Lara Jean
 Noah Centineo as Peter, Lara Jean's boyfriend and a popular lacrosse player
 Rian McCririck as young Peter
 Janel Parrish as Margot, Lara Jean's mature and responsible older sister who goes to college in Scotland
 Anna Cathcart as Kitty, Lara Jean's playful little sister who got her and Peter together
John Corbett as Dr. Covey, Lara Jean's kind and somewhat protective father
Sarayu Blue as Trina Rothschild, the Coveys' friendly neighbor who develops a budding romance with Lara Jean's dad
Madeleine Arthur as Christine, Gen's cousin and Lara Jean's best friend (who goes by "Chris")
 Ross Butler as Trevor, Peter and Lara Jean's good friend and Chris' on-and-off boyfriend
 Emilija Baranac as Genevieve, a pretty and popular girl who is Peter's ex-girlfriend, and Lara Jean's best-friend-turned-rival (who goes by "Gen")
 Trezzo Mahoro as Lucas, Lara Jean's gay and amiable friend as well as one of her former love-interests
 Kelcey Mawema as Emily, Gen's friend
Sofia Black-D'Elia as Heather
 Henry Thomas as Mr. Kavinsky, Peter's father
 Jeon Ho-Young as Dae, Kitty’s boyfriend in South Korea

Production
The producers began work on Always and Forever while P.S. I Still Love You was still in production, hiring Katie Lovejoy to write the script off Han's third novel and Michael Fimognari to direct. Principal photography began in Vancouver, British Columbia, Canada on July 15, 2019, two months after production on the second film wrapped, although the production was formally announced only in August 2019.

Soundtrack

The film's soundtrack, titled To All the Boys: Always and Forever (Music from the Netflix Film), was released digitally on February 12, 2021 by Capitol Records.

Release
The film was released on February 12, 2021. It was the most-watched title in its debut weekend, and the fourth-most in its second weekend. Netflix reported that the film was watched by 51 million of households during its first quarter.

Reception
Review aggregator website Rotten Tomatoes reports that 79% of 61 critics gave the film a positive review, with an average rating of 6.5/10. The website's critics consensus reads, "Diminishing returns have set in for this trilogy, but To All the Boys: Always and Forever has just enough of the original's effervescent charm to serve as a worthy conclusion." According to Metacritic, which sampled 17 critics and calculated a weighted average score of 65 out of 100, the film received "generally favorable reviews".

References

External links

 

2021 films
2021 romantic comedy films
2020s teen comedy films
2020s teen romance films
American romantic comedy films
American teen comedy films
American teen romance films
Awesomeness Films films
English-language Netflix original films
Films based on American novels
Films based on romance novels
Films based on young adult literature
Films set in New York City
Films set in Portland, Oregon
Films set in Seoul
Films shot in Seoul
Films shot in Vancouver
Overbrook Entertainment films
Paramount Pictures films
2020s English-language films
2020s American films